The Four Evangelists is a c. 1656-1660 oil on canvas painting by Mattia Preti. It was one of forty paintings given to the Museo della Regia Università degli Studi in Palermo by Ferdinand II of the Two Sicilies and now hangs in that city's Palazzo Abatellis.

References

Paintings in Palazzo Abatellis
1650s paintings
Paintings by Mattia Preti
Paintings depicting John the Apostle
Paintings depicting Matthew the Apostle
Paintings depicting Mark the Evangelist
Paintings depicting Luke the Evangelist